Torture is generally defined as deliberately inflicting "severe pain or suffering" on a prisoner, but exactly what this means in practice is disputed.

International level

UN Convention Against Torture
The United Nations Convention against Torture and Other Cruel, Inhuman or Degrading Treatment or Punishment, which is currently in force since 26 June 1987, provides a broad definition of torture. Article 1.1 of the UN Convention Against Torture reads:

This definition was restricted to apply only to nations and to government-sponsored torture and clearly limits the torture to that perpetrated, directly or indirectly, by those acting in an official capacity, such as government personnel, law enforcement personnel, medical personnel, military personnel, or politicians. It appears to exclude:
 torture perpetrated by gangs, hate groups, rebels, or terrorists who ignore national or international mandates;
 random violence during war; and
 punishment allowed by national laws, even if the punishment uses techniques similar to those used by torturers such as mutilation, whipping, or corporal punishment when practiced as lawful punishment. Some professionals in the torture rehabilitation field believe that this definition is too restrictive and that the definition of politically motivated torture should be broadened to include all acts of organized violence.

Declaration of Tokyo

An even broader definition was used in the 1975 Declaration of Tokyo regarding the participation of medical professionals in acts of torture:

For the purpose of this Declaration, torture is defined as the deliberate, systematic or wanton infliction of physical or mental suffering by one or more persons acting alone or on the orders of any authority, to force another person to yield information, to make a confession, or for any other reason.

This definition includes torture as part of domestic violence or ritualistic abuse, as well as in criminal activities.

Rome Statute of the International Criminal Court
The Rome Statute is the treaty that set up the International Criminal Court (ICC). The treaty was adopted at a diplomatic conference in Rome on 17 July 1998 and went into effect on 1 July 2002. The Rome Statute provides the simplest definition of torture regarding the prosecution of war criminals by the International Criminal Court. Paragraph 1 under Article 7(e) of the Rome Statute provides that:

Inter-American Convention to Prevent and Punish Torture

The Inter-American Convention to Prevent and Punish Torture, which is in force since 28 February 1987, defines torture more expansively than the United Nations Convention Against Torture. Article 2 of the Inter-American Convention reads:

Amnesty International

Since 1973, Amnesty International has adopted the simplest, broadest definition of torture. It reads:

Torture is the systematic and deliberate infliction of acute pain by one person on another, or on a third person, in order to accomplish the purpose of the former against the will of the latter.

European Court of Human Rights

The UN Convention Against Torture and Rome Statute and the definitions of torture include terms such as "severe pain or suffering". The international European Court of Human Rights (ECHR) has ruled on the difference between what is inhuman and degrading treatment and what is pain and suffering severe enough to be torture.

In Ireland v. United Kingdom (1979–1980) the ECHR ruled that the five techniques developed by the United Kingdom (wall-standing, hooding, subjection to noise, deprivation of sleep, and deprivation of food and drink), as used against fourteen detainees in Northern Ireland by the United Kingdom were "inhuman and degrading" and breached the European Convention on Human Rights, but did not amount to "torture". In 2014, after new information was uncovered that showed the decision to use the five techniques in Northern Ireland in 1971–1972 had been taken by British ministers, The Irish Government asked the ECHR to review its judgement. In 2018, by six votes to one, the Court declined.

In Aksoy v. Turkey (1997) the Court found Turkey guilty of torture in 1996 in the case of a detainee who was suspended by his arms while his hands were tied behind his back.

The Court's ruling that the five techniques did not amount to torture was later cited by the United States and Israel to justify their own interrogation methods, which included the five techniques.

The Court has ruled that every form of torture is strictly prohibited in all circumstances:

Municipal level

United States

U.S. Code § 2340
Title 18 of the United States Code contains the definition of torture in 18 U.S.C. § 2340, which is only applicable to persons committing or attempting to commit torture outside of the United States. It reads:

In order for the United States to assume control over this jurisdiction, the alleged offender must be a U.S. national or the alleged offender must be present in the United States, irrespective of the nationality of the victim or alleged offender. Any person who conspires to commit an offense shall be subject to the same penalties (other than the penalty of death) as the penalties prescribed for an actual act or attempting to commit an act, the commission of which was the object of the conspiracy.

Torture Victim Protection Act of 1991
The Torture Victim Protection Act of 1991 provides remedies to individuals who are victims of torture by persons acting in an official capacity of any foreign nation. The definition is similar to the U.S. Code § 2340, which reads:

References

Further reading

Torture
Definitions